The Chicago, Rock Island and Pacific Passenger Depot-Pella, also known as the Pella Depot and the Rolscreen Museum, is a historic building located in Pella, Iowa, United States. The Des Moines Valley Railroad built the first tracks through the area in 1865, and they built a simple frame depot to serve passenger's needs. For 10 years, Pella served as the only rail stop in Marion County until a competing station was built in Knoxville, Iowa by the Chicago, Burlington, and Quincy Railroad. The Chicago, Rock Island & Pacific Railroad leased the Des Moines Valley's tracks beginning in 1878 and provided freight service through 1980. The old frame building was replaced, in 1906, with a single story, brick depota conventional building style for the railroad. The new, brick depot served as a passenger station until the latter 1940s. The last passenger service was as a stop on a short line motor train service between Eldon in southeast Iowa and Des Moines. The station was freight only by 1949.

In 1975 the future of the depot was thrown into question when the Rock Island Line filed for bankruptcy protection. However, the Pella Corporation, whose headquarters are adjacent, acquired the property and converted the depot into a company museum. It was listed on the National Register of Historic Places in 1991.

References

Railway stations in the United States opened in 1906
Railway stations closed in 1973
Pella
Former railway stations in Iowa
Pella, Iowa
Museums in Marion County, Iowa
National Register of Historic Places in Marion County, Iowa
Railway stations on the National Register of Historic Places in Iowa
Transportation buildings and structures in Marion County, Iowa
1906 establishments in Iowa
1973 disestablishments in Iowa